Enrique Radigales (born 1970 in Zaragoza, Spain) is a contemporary Spanish artist. After studying at Escola Massana de Barcelona and graduating from the Interactive Systems program at UPC University, Barcelona he lives and works in Madrid.

Work
Using HTML programming, video, photography and digital or analogue drawing techniques, his work explores the boundaries between digital and physical world to show an increasingly diffusing field where technological progress is questioned as a reflection of the economical and social evolution. Enrique Radigales is an artist based in Madrid, Spain. He works with HTML programming, installations and drawing techniques to explore the border between the digital and the analogue worlds. By doing so, he creates an ever-increasing field that allows him to comment on the technological progress as a reflection of the social and financial evolution, and therefore the relationships between temporality and technology.

Enrique studied painting at Escola Massana in Barcelona and graduated from the Interactive Systems program at UPC University, Barcelona, in 1996.

His work has been shown individually in international museums and cultural centers, such as MIS (São Paulo), Instituto Cervantes (Bordeaux) or La Casa Encendida (Madrid), and has participated in several biennials as WRO 2011 (Wroclaw, Poland), Biennial IEEB4 (Sibiu, Romania) or Biennal Electrohype (Ystad, Sweden).

Radigales was an Eyebeam artist-in-residence in 2012.

Exhibitions

Solo shows
2010 Contain the painting - Antonia Puyó Gallery. Zaragoza, Spain
2010 Dossier: Plug&Pray. Intervenciones - Casa Encendida, Madrid, Spain
2009 Wall Source - Formato Cómodo Galery, Madrid, Spain
2009 Enrique Radigales: idealword.org - MIS - Museu da Imagem e do Som, São Paulo
2009 Boombox - Cervantes Institute of Burdeos, Burdeos, France
2008 Ruina y paisaje - CDAN Center of Art and Nature, Beulas Foundation, Huesca, Spain
2007 Tecnología lenta - Antonia Puyó Galery, Zaragoza, Spain

Group shows
2011 14 Media Art Biennal WRO 2011 Alternative Now - Wroclaw, Poland
2011 Reproduction, repetition and Rebellion - Center for Graphic Art and Visual Researches AKADEMIJA, Belgrade. Servia
2011 Horizonte Vazado: artistas latinoamericanos en el filo - Cervantes Institute, Säo Paulo. Brazil 
2010 Nulla dies sine linea - Freies Museum, Berlín. Germany
2010 Electrohype 2010 - Ystads Konstmuseum, Ystad
2010 Arsenal - Baró Galeria, São Paulo
2009 Video in Foco/Photo in Foco - Galeria Baró Cruz, São Paulo
2009 Secuencias - Galería Antonia Puyó, Saragossa
2008 Urban Jealousy - the 1st International Roaming Biennial of Tehran - International Roaming Biennial of Tehran, Tehran
2006 BCN Producció ’06 - Institut de Cultura de Barcelona, La Capella, Barcelona
2004 El 6to Salón Pirelli de Jóvenes Artistas Digitales - MACCSI Museo Arte Contemporáneo de Caracas Sofía Imber, Caracas
2001 Habitaciones - Galería Lausin & Blasco, Saragossa

References

External links
 
 
 

Spanish multimedia artists
1970 births
Living people
Spanish installation artists